Euchorthippus declivus, the Jersey grasshopper or sharp-tailed grasshopper, is a species of short-horned grasshoppers belonging to the family Acrididae, subfamily Gomphocerinae.

Description
The basic coloration of the body varies from light brown to beige, or occasionally yellow-green. Two or three darker and clearer longitudinal stripes start from the eyes. The head is relatively large. The bottom of the abdomen is yellow, usually with an orange tip in males. Wings are atrophied in both sexes.

Distribution and habitat
This very common species is present in middle and southern Europe. Euchorthippus declivus inhabits arid and sunny environments, southern slopes, gravely plots with sparse vegetation, very dry to moderate wet meadows and pastures.

Biology
They can be encountered from July through October feeding on grasses. The eggs overwinter in the soil.

References

declivus
Insects described in 1848
Taxa named by Charles N. F. Brisout
Orthoptera of Europe